The discography of the Australian punk band Mr Floppy currently consists of two singles, one EP and three albums.

Albums

Breakfast 

Breakfast is the debut album by Mr Floppy. It was released on 16 December 1991 and contains the tracks from their previous EP Firm and Fruity alongside three versions of a previously unreleased track, "Breakfast" (a parody of the Australian Crawl song "Reckless").

Gratuitous 

Gratuitous is the second album by the band. It was released in 1992, and features a re-recording of "100 000 Morrisseys" in a rap rock-style, and a cover of the Yugoslavian beer drinking song, "The Tree in the Wood".

The Unbearable Lightness of Being a Dickhead 

Released in 1993, The Unbearable Lightness of Being a Dickhead is the band's third and final album. The album contained two covers of "Wuthering Heights", originally by Kate Bush.

Track list

Track 8 is a sample from a porn film, with the stereo channels in inverse directions. Track 16 is an instrumental version of Wuthering Heights with no guitars, bass or drums. Track 20 is a minute of silence followed by someone saying "Floppy Floop". "Boring Fart" has the mantra Om mani padme hum chanted throughout. The lyrics to "Sunflowers" are taken from various letters written by Vincent van Gogh in the final years of his life.

Singles and EPs

"100 000 Morrisseys" 

"100 000 Morrisseys" is the debut single by Mr Floppy. It was written by Tim Aylward and Paul Johnson. It was recorded and released in 1989 on the Zombie Penis Death label and was later reissued in 1990 on Waterfront. The single was produced by Keith Baxter and got negative reviews but was played on John Peel's radio show. It uses a sample of the beginning of "This Charming Man" and samples other Smiths songs throughout the track. The B-side is a 2-minute instrumental (except for the chorus). In 1992, it was released on the album Gratuitous in a re-recorded version in which the vocals were rapped.

Track list

Firm and Fruity 

Firm and Fruity is the first extended play by Mr Floppy. It was released in 1990 and contains 6 tracks, despite 8 tracks being listed on the cover.

The track "Noonan" went on to be a fan favourite. Its chorus resembles that of "Cool for Cats" by the UK Squeeze.

Track list

As well as the 6 tracks above, the tracks "She Bangs the Drum Machine" and "He Eat Like a Duck" are listed on the label.

"Up the Duff" samples a line from National Lampoon's European Vacation. "Stir Fry Baby" features an extended outro with duelling wah-wah solos from Aylward and Carroll. "God Loves You" samples the spoken intro ("I still believe in God, but God no longer believes in me") from The Mission's song "Wasteland".

Live versions of tracks 1 and 5 were included in the hidden track section of the album The Unbearable Lightness of Being a Dickhead. The entire EP was included on the album Breakfast. In 1991, a test pressing was made for a planned "Homebrew" single. It was never released to the public, however.

Poontang* 

Poontang* were a band formed in 1994 by Paul Johnson (ex-Mr Floppy), Jonathan Rayson-Hill, Michael Betinsky and Hamish Cheyne. They never got as popular as Mr Floppy and in fact only played 23 concerts before disbanding in late 1999. 

Musically, the group were a continuation of the hard rock cultivated by Johnson during Mr Floppy's twilight years.

Poonball 

Poonball is the first and only album by Poontang*, released in October 1998.

Track list

Punk rock discographies
Discographies of Australian artists